Awathahi is village located in Mohammadabad tehsil of Ghazipur district, Uttar Pradesh, India. Its 703 households gave it a population of 4,597 at the 2011 Census of India.

Administration
Awathahi Basant village is administrated by Pradhan who is elected representative of village as per constitution of India and Panchyati Raaj Act.

References

Villages in Ghazipur district